Monday Monday is an ITV, UTV comedy drama. It stars Fay Ripley, Jenny Agutter, Neil Stuke, Holly Aird, Morven Christie, Tom Ellis, and Miranda Hart.

It is set in the head office of a supermarket that has fallen on hard times and had to re-locate its staff from London to Leeds. The show was initially announced as part of ITV's Winter 2007 press pack, but was "iced" until 2009 due to falling advertising in the wake of the economic downturn.

Background 
The show is named after The Mamas & the Papas song with the same name, though does not feature the song as a theme tune.

The show was commissioned by ITV's director of drama, Laura Mackie. Mackie said that the show aimed to "entertain, engage and strike a chord with the audience". Although the show was initially announced as part of ITV's Winter 2007 press pack, it was put on hold until 2009 due to falling advertising rates in the wake of the economic downturn. According to Broadcast, the show aimed to "shed light on a world of alcoholic HR bosses, power-crazed managers and sexually unfettered PAs".

Towards the end of the first episode, Christine is shown to be an alcoholic, which she eventually admits.  As the series progresses the failing life of Christine becomes more central to the plot.

Plot 
The show features a group of head office workers for struggling supermarket chain Butterworths. As a result of downsizing, the workers are forced to move cities, relocating from London to Leeds.

Cast
Management
Clive Merrison – Gavin, Chairman, Butterworths Group
Peter Wight – Roger Sorsby, Chief Executive of Butterworth's Stores
Jenny Agutter – Jenny Mountfield, PA to Roger Sorsby
Holly Aird – Alyson Cartmell, Chief Operating Officer
Tom Ellis – Steven McColl, PA to Alyson Cartmell

Human Resources
Fay Ripley – Christine Frances, Head of Human Resources
Morven Christie – Sally Newman, PA to Christine
Miranda Hart – Tall Karen, Office Assistant
Jodie Taibi – Small Karen, Office Assistant

Marketing
Neil Stuke – Max Chambers, Acting Head of Marketing
Laura Haddock – Natasha Wright, Marketing Assistant (prev. PA to Vivienne Wyatt. With Vivienne off sick recovering from cancer, Natasha is seconded to Max Chambers)
Saikat Ahamed – Vince, PA to Max Chambers & Natasha Wright (prev. PA to Max Chambers)

Finance
Nick Sampson – Keith Saunders, Head of Finance

Building Services & Facilities Management
Joan Oliver – Susan, Facilities Manager
Susan Earl – Janet, Facilities Assistant

Shop Floor
Sue Vincent – Helen, Bakery Manager
Bruce McGregor – Greg, Fish Manager
Richard Fleeshman – Gillon, Bakery Customer Service Assistant

The departments named above are the main departments focused on but other departments are mentioned or featured on presentations. They include:
Contracts
Sourcing
IT
Design
Property
International Sales
National Sales

Butterworths Group PLC 
Butterworths Head Office

The Head Office is arranged into a North Wing and a South Wing on all floors above the Lower Ground Floor.
Lower Ground: Canteen, Building Services/Property/Facilities Management & Sourcing
Ground Floor: Marketing (South) Meeting Area (North) & Reception/Security in Centre
First Floor: Human Resources (South) Contracts (North)
Second Floor: International Sales (South) Finance & Chief Executive's Office (North)
Third Floor: National Sales (South) Design (North)

Other Services than Retail are Insurance Sales. Each department is managed by a Department Head and each department head has a personal assistant

Episodes 
Episode 1 (13 July 2009)
Episode 2 (20 July 2009)
Episode 3 (27 July 2009)
Episode 4 (3 August 2009)
Episode 5 (10 August 2009)
Episode 6 (17 August 2009)
Episode 7 (24 August 2009)

Broadcast and reception 
The show did not receive good reviews. Tim Walker of The Independent stated that the shows rival in the same timeslot, BBC One show The Street was "a darn sight more interesting than watching Fay Ripley walk into doors". Walker said that the show was filled with shots of Leeds, saying that the show was purely "advertising it as an attractive nightlife destination" or "to prove beyond doubt that ITV was fulfilling its obligations to the regions." (something that may have been fitting with ITV mothballing many parts of its Leeds Studios the same year). Sam Wollaston of The Guardian also criticised the show saying that it was "lame and laboured, tired and predictable".

The poor reception was reflected in the show's ratings, the show bringing in 3.7 million, a 16% viewing share, six percent and 1.3 million viewers lower than The Street. The show, however, was second in its timeslot, beating the other three terrestrial channels in the slot. Despite being second in the timeslot, the show was down on the 5.6 million for ITV1's channel slot average so far in 2009.

Not helping matters in terms of viewing figures was the fact that STV continued its recent trend of declining high-ticket ITV productions, thereby avoiding having to contribute to the production cost on a pro rata basis, and so Scottish viewers of terrestrial broadcasts were unable to view the series. The series average, based on overnight ratings was 2.90m, equating to a 13.2% viewing share.

International broadcasts
In Australia, this programme aired each Friday at 8:30pm on ABC2 from 28 January 2011.
In Serbia, this programme aired on Fox Life. In the United States the show is on Hulu.com and currently available via Netflix and YouTube.

References

2009 British television series debuts
2009 British television series endings
ITV comedy
ITV television dramas
Television series by Fremantle (company)
Television shows set in Leeds